Historisch Centrum Leeuwarden (Historical Center Leeuwarden), located in Leeuwarden, Netherlands, preserves documents pertaining to the history of Leeuwarden.

History
Leeuwarden was the first Dutch city to get an official city archive in 1838. Wopke Eekhoff was the first archivist. Historisch Centrum Leeuwarden (HCL) was established in 2001. Since 2007 it is located in a new building in the city-centre.

Preservation
The main focus of Historisch Centrum Leeuwarden is preserving the municipal archives of Leeuwarden. The archives  consists of hundreds of archives from the municipal government, companies, private people, families and various organisations. It also houses the largest image collection of the northern Netherlands, an extensive library with books and multimedia and a municipal art collection. The exhibition The story of Leeuwarden tells the history of the Frisian capital.

It is also custodian of Archaeological Centre Leeuwarden, the leaning tower of Oldehove and the nearby Pier Pander Museum with Temple.

See also 
 Tresoar

References

External links 
 
 

Culture in Leeuwarden
Buildings and structures in Leeuwarden
City archives
Archives in the Netherlands
2001 establishments in the Netherlands
21st-century architecture in the Netherlands